Viren Wilfred Rasquinha (born 13 September 1980) is an Indian former field hockey player and captain of the Indian national team. He was a member of the team that competed at the 2004 Athens Olympics. He quit international hockey in 2008 to pursue management studies at the age of 28. He came to gitam

Early life
Rasquinha was born in 1980 to Eric and Merlyn Rasquinha. He studied at St. Stanislaus High School in Bandra, Mumbai, then graduated with a B.Com from MMK College in Bandra.

Hockey career
Rasquinha made his junior international debut in 1999, and was part of the team that won the 2001 Junior World Cup in Hobart, Australia.

He made his senior international debut as a midfielder in May 2002, at a Four Nation Tournament in Adelaide. He won a silver medal at the 2002 Asian Games in Busan, gold medals at the Asia Cup in Kuala Lumpur and the Afro-Asian Games in Hyderabad in 2003. He was part of the Olympic team which finished seventh in Athens in the 2004 Olympic Games. He led the Indian Hockey team for the first time in the bilateral series against Pakistan in 2004. He was also captain of the Premier Hockey League team Maratha Warriors, and played for Tata Sports, Air India, and the Indian Oil Corporation, as well as 180 international matches. Rasquinha announced his retirement from hockey on 15 January 2008 at the age of 28, to pursue his studies.

Business career
After retiring from hockey, Rasquinha studied for a Masters in Business Administration (MBA) at the Indian School of Business in Hyderabad.  After completion of his MBA, he joined Olympic Gold Quest in 2009, and is now the CEO.

Along with Pullela Gopichand and Abhinav Bindra, he was a member of the PMO Task Force after the 2016 Rio Olympics that prepared India's plans for the Olympic Games in 2020, 2024 and 2028. Their report was submitted to the PMO on 12 August 2017.

Rasquinha was named as one of the "Top 40 Under 40" leaders in India for 2017-18 by the Economic Times.

Personal life
Rasquinha got married in 2013 to Smitha Nair.

Honours
2004, Shiv Chhatrapati Award from the Government of Maharashtra.
2005, Arjuna Award for Best Sportsman of the Year in Hockey.

References

General
 Official MoneyControl website Interview
 Official ISB website Interview
 Rediff website Interview

External links
 
 Viren Rasquinha at bharatiyahockey.org

1980 births
Living people
Field hockey players from Maharashtra
Olympic field hockey players of India
Field hockey players at the 2004 Summer Olympics
Field hockey players at the 2006 Commonwealth Games
Recipients of the Arjuna Award
Mangaloreans
Indian Christians
Asian Games medalists in field hockey
World Series Hockey players
Field hockey players at the 2002 Asian Games
Indian male field hockey players
Asian Games silver medalists for India
Medalists at the 2002 Asian Games
Commonwealth Games competitors for India
2006 Men's Hockey World Cup players